Dror Ze'evi (born 1953, Haifa) is an Israeli historian who studies political, social and cultural history of the Ottoman Empire, Turkey and the Levant.

Ze'evi's father, was deputy head of Mossad, and his mother, Galila, is an interior designer. Ze'evi grew up in different cities around Israel and the world, including several years in France and Britain. He served as an intelligence officer in the IDF until 1983, and was awarded the rank of Lt. Col. during his reserve service.

He wrote his Ph.D. dissertation at Tel-Aviv University, on the Ottoman district of Jerusalem in the seventeenth century, and spent a post-doctoral year at Princeton on a Rothschild Fellowship.

In 1992, he returned to Israel and, along with Professor Meir Zamir, founded the Department of Middle East Studies at Ben Gurion University of the Negev. He served as the Department's first chair from 1995 to 1998, and again from 2002-2004. He also participated in the founding of the Chaim Herzog Center for Middle East Studies and Diplomacy, and served as its first chair from 1997 to 2002.

Ze'evi was part of the group of scholars who relaunched the veteran Israeli "Oriental Society" and renamed it MEISAI (Middle East and Islamic Studies Association of Israel). He served as the Association's first president, from 2006 to 2009. He is also one of the founders of the Israeli Forum for Regional Thinking.

Works

References

Living people
Israeli historians
Scholars of Ottoman history
Historians of sexuality
1953 births